Spyros Koukoulomatis (Σπύρος Κουκουλομάτης) (17 August 1917 – 21 October 1995) was a Greek painter.

Biography
Born in Athens in 1917 by a Greek father hailing from Mani, Peloponnesus and a French-Swiss mother. He was initially a Piraeus inhabitant and then he moved in Cesariani, Athens in 1963.

He studied at Elefthero Spoudastirio (Free Seminary) of Lucas Yeralis (1933-1938) and at the Athens School of Fine Arts (1936-1938).

He studied Philosophy and Sociology of Art and was always independent from galleries and art dealers.

Work 
Since 1951 he participated in more than fifty collective exhibitions in Greece and abroad. He held numerous personal exhibitions as well. Pieces of his artwork can be found at the Municipal Galleries of Piraeus and Kalamata, in private collections in the United States of America, Scotland, Switzerland, Sweden, Germany, Australia, Bulgaria and Greece.

Describing his work, the art critic Panos Panagiotouni once wrote "... he has a personal colour feast .. persistent devotion to the form, with compositions from mythology and everyday life."

Paintings

References
 Adaptation of the Greek Wikipedia article.
 Les Arts en Europe - Editions Christian Hals Book II page 17.
 Piraeus Dairy, File Piraeus Studies (1966) Volume I, page 68.
 The Greek Painters - Dictionary of Greek Painters and Engravers. Volume IV, page 196.
 Greek Modern Art - Editions Ora (1970) page 109.

External links 
Spyros Koukoulomatis' official site

1917 births
1995 deaths
Artists from Piraeus
20th-century Greek painters